St Michael's, Nowra, is a parish of the Roman Catholic Diocese of Wollongong in Australia. The parish takes in the northern Shoalhaven City region. It incorporates the Church Communities of St Michael, Nowra; St Patrick, Berry, Sacred Heart, Bomaderry; Mary, Help of Christians, Culburra; St Joseph, Kangaroo Valley; and Holy Spirit, Vincentia.

History
According to the Australian Catholic Directory the district of the Shoalhaven (now the Parish of Nowra) was established in 1863. This means that 2013 will mark the 150th anniversary or Sesquicentenary of the parish.

When the Illawarra Mission was established in 1838, Fr John Rigney made monthly visits to the Shoalhaven, to celebrate Mass and the sacraments. In the 1840s a wooden building was constructed in Nowra to serve as a Mass chapel and as the first school. The 1841 Catholic Directory noted that there were an estimated 150 Catholics in the Shoalhaven district and that an average of 80 attended the monthly Mass.

The parish of Shoalhaven-Ulladulla was established in 1863 with Fr David D’Arcy as the first resident priest. In 1865 the Mass centre at Nowra was rebuilt and it was to remain the Mass centre for Nowra for another twelve years. It was first thought that Numbaa would be the centre for the Shoalhaven parish; but the Shoalhaven River floods of the 1860s and 1870s caused the main settlement to move to Nowra. Because of that, the building of the church at Numbaa, for which a foundation stone had been laid in 1869, did not proceed. The original presbytery at Numbaa, given to the Church by David Berry, still stands.

Other centres also constructed their own church buildings. The original Kangaroo Valley church, with accommodation for only 30, was built in 1874. In November, 1875, Archbishop Roger Vaughan laid the foundation stone of St. Michael's Church Nowra. He later blessed and opened it on 30 September 1877. It cost 1,200 pounds. Two years later, land was purchased at Berry, and 21 March 1884 saw the opening of the new church there. The first Nowra presbytery was to cost 295 pounds. It was later to serve as the first convent from 1893-1905.

According to the Catholic Year Book of 1882 the churches in the Shoalhaven parish were: St Michael's, Nowra; St Patrick's, Broughton Creek; St Mary's, Ulladulla and St Joseph's, Kangaroo Valley. There were also Mass stations at Greenwell Point, Coolangatta, Milton and Woodburn. Weekday Mass was in the church and sometimes in the presbytery (which was still at Numbaa). The Catholic population was estimated to be about 1,200.

On 8 October 1887, the present presbytery was opened, having cost 900 pounds. In 1888 the Sisters of St Joseph arrived in Berry and opened their school for 48 children. The same year saw the opening of the present St Joseph's Church, Kangaroo Valley, at a cost of 849 pounds.

On the 6 November 1921, the blessing and opening of the extensions of St Michael's Church, Nowra, took place. Twenty feet were added to the length of the church, the gallery was constructed and the shingles on the roof were replaced by tiles. The extensions were in harmony with the fabric of the church. The cost had been 1,660 pounds. Later that day, there was the blessing of the foundation stone of the new convent at Berry. The new church at Berry was opened in 1936.

The next parish priest, Monsignor John Purcell arrived in December 1956. He immediately embarked on an extensive programme of school building, then church extensions and renovations. In 1959, the building of Sacred Heart Church, Bomaderry; in 1963, further renovations to St Michael's in 1969; the building of Our Lady, Help of Christians’ Church, Culburra in 1978; Holy Spirit Church, Vincentia, in 1983 and the re-establishment of a Catholic High School in Nowra, with St John the Evangelist High School. 
With over 9,000 Catholics, six churches, three other Mass centres and over 600 children in St Michael's School, much has been achieved in this parish in 150 years. The Sisters of St Joseph left Berry in 1978, and St Patrick's School closed the following year.  The current parish priest, Fr. Patrick J. Faherty took up the office in 1993.

St Michael's Church, Nowra (1877)

St Michael's, Nowra is a Gothic Revival church opened on 30 September 1877. The church is built of squared rubble stonework in courses and originally had a shingle roof. The stonework is generally in good condition and despite several additions over the years, the southern and western elevations still indicate the original character of the building.

The style of the church is known as Early English Gothic (1189 - 1307) also known as Lancet which is most marked by the simplicity of its ornament. Early English Gothic elements can be seen in the stained glass window to the western wall, the tall narrow window openings, projecting buttresses, articulated quoins and steep pitched root. The stonework to the western stained glass window when viewed from the outside has architectural origins dating back to 1170.

In 1921 additional accommodation was constructed on the eastern end. The original church extended to the present choir loft. The addition was sympathetic to the original church, however the shingle roof was re¬placed with tiles. Additional stained glass windows were added at this time.
Further additions were carried out in 1958 including the side entrance and sacristy.

The parish also contains two schools: St Michael's Primary School and St John the Evangelist High School.

References

Roman Catholic churches in New South Wales
City of Shoalhaven
19th-century Roman Catholic church buildings in Australia